Roger Bolton may refer to:

Roger Bolton (broadcaster) (born 1945), British radio and television producer and presenter
Roger Bolton (trade unionist) (1947–2006), British trade unionist in the broadcasting industry